Church World Service (CWS) was founded in 1946 and is a cooperative ministry of 37 Christian denominations and communions, providing sustainable self-help, development, disaster relief, and refugee assistance around the world. The CWS mission is to eradicate hunger and poverty and to promote peace and justice at the national and international level through collaboration with partners abroad and in the US.

Program areas
Disaster response

When disaster strikes, CWS works with partners on the scene to provide shelter, food and water, blankets, recovery kits, counseling – the basics needed to ensure the survival of individuals and communities at risk.  In addition to rapid emergency disaster response, CWS also provides long-term development initiative, helping vulnerable families and communities prepare for and recover from natural and human-caused calamities. For example, in drought-ridden Ethiopia, CWS and partners are assisting 120,000 people with food and seeds to restart farming activities.

In the United States, when disaster strikes, CWS dispatches disaster response specialists where needed in order to provide assistance to local interfaith groups assessing and responding to the material and spiritual needs of their communities. After Hurricanes Ike and Gustav hit the U.S. Gulf Coast, CWS reached out to its network of long-term recovery groups for project development support and also for provision of material resources such as CWS Blankets and Kits.  Since Hurricanes Katrina and Rita, CWS has partnered with Habitat for Humanity and has invested in building long-term recovery capacity along the Gulf Coast. As a result of this collaboration more than 640 houses were repaired or rebuilt in the targeted area of the Gulf Coast.

Refugee assistance

CWS helps meet the needs of refugees in protracted situations and those who are able to return home. It also serves tens of thousands of refugees, immigrants, and asylum seekers in the U.S. and around the world each year with screening for potential resettlement to the U.S., chaplaincy, legal, and other professional services. Working with denominations and congregational co-sponsors, CWS and its network of resettlement affiliates have welcomed and found new homes in the U.S. for more than 450,000 refugees since 1946.

Immigration

CWS strongly supports comprehensive immigration reform and argued in 2014 that Congress "should enact immigration reform that will provide a permanent solution and a path to citizenship for all our undocumented community members."

CROP Hunger Walks 

The largest fund-raising events for Church World Service are CROP Hunger Walks (Christian Rural Overseas Program ).  The first CROP Hunger Walk was in the 1960s.  Now more than 2,000 communities across the U.S. join in CROP Hunger Walks each year.  A unique aspect of CROP Hunger Walks is that Church World Service doesn't receive all of the money raised.  Up to 25% of the money donated is given to local hunger fighting agencies which include food banks and community gardens. Additionally, those sponsoring a walker can specify whether Church World Service or an alternative global hunger-fighting agency will receive the remaining 75% of the donation.

Blankets+

Through the Blankets+ program, more than 8,000 congregations and groups enable CWS to respond to disasters and assist communities by providing the necessary tools needed to build sustainable lives.

CWS Kits

CWS Kits include hygiene kits, school kits, baby kits, and emergency clean-up buckets. Last year, with the support of affiliated congregations and religious groups, CWS provided 298,000 Kits in the United States and abroad.

Church World Service earned a B+ rating from the American Institute of Philanthropy and was also named one of the Top 100 Highly Rated Charities by GiveSpot.com. CWS currently has a 4-star rating from Charity Navigator.

On August 26, 2009 CWS was part of the 300+ Groups Ask Senate for Stronger Climate Bill letter to Senate.

Participating churches and organizations
The member communions:

 African Methodist Episcopal Church
 African Methodist Episcopal Zion Church
 Alliance of Baptists
 American Baptist Churches USA
 Diocese of the Armenian Church of America (including Diocese of California)
 Christian Church (Disciples of Christ)
 Christian Methodist Episcopal Church
 Church of the Brethren
 Coptic Orthodox Church in North America
 Ecumenical Catholic Communion
 Episcopal Church in the United States of America
 Evangelical Lutheran Church in America
 Friends United Meeting
 Greek Orthodox Archdiocese of America
 Hungarian Reformed Church in America
 International Council of Community Churches
 Korean Presbyterian Church in America
 Malankara Orthodox Syrian Church
 Mar Thoma Church

 Moravian Church in America
 National Baptist Convention of America, Inc.
 National Baptist Convention, USA, Inc.
 National Missionary Baptist Convention of America
 Orthodox Church in America
 Patriarchal Parishes of the Russian Orthodox Church in the U.S.A.
 Philadelphia Yearly Meeting of the Religious Society of Friend
 Polish National Catholic Church
 Presbyterian Church (U.S.A.)
 Progressive National Baptist Convention
 Reformed Church in America
 Serbian Orthodox Church in the U.S.A. and Canada
 Swedenborgian Church of North America
 Syriac Orthodox Church
 Ukrainian Orthodox Church of the USA
 United Church of Christ
 United Methodist Church

List of local resettlement affiliates 
The organization has more than twenty affiliate refugee and immigration offices located in seventeen  states.

Comsats Community Development Unit, Abbotabad, Pakistan
Lutheran Social Ministry of the Southwest
Episcopal Diocese of Los Angeles
Opening Doors, Inc. 
Center for New Americans
Ecumenical Refugee Services
Integrated Refugee and Immigrant Services
New American Pathways, Inc.
Interfaith Refugee and Immigration Services
Exodus Refugee Immigration
Kentucky Refugee Ministries, Inc.
Refugee Immigration Ministry
Programs Assisting Refugee Acculturation
Lutheran Immigration and Refugee Service

Heartland Refugee Resettlement, Inc.
Interfaith Refugee Resettlement Program
Journey's End Refugee Services
Catholic Family Center, Refugee Resettlement Program
Interfaith Works of Central New York, Inc.
Lutheran Family Services in the Carolinas
Community Refugee & Immigration Services
Sponsors Organized to Assist Refugees
Bridge Refugee Services
Refugee Services of Texas
Interfaith Ministries for Greater Houston
Virginia Council of Churches Refugee Resettlement Program
Interchurch Refugee Ministries

See also
VOLAG

References

External links
 
 
 

Religious charities based in the United States
Christian ecumenical organizations
Refugee aid organizations in the United States
Christian relief organizations
Christian organizations established in 1946
International Christian organizations